The Tutok To Win Party-List is a political organization seeking party-list representation in the House of Representatives of the Philippines.

Background
The Tutok To Win Party-List took part in the 2022 election aiming to secure at least a seat in the House of Representatives. Its platform tackles affordable housing, education, livelihood and health and aims to advance the interest of the indigent population, especially for those residing in the urban areas, the elderly and the youth.

Tutok To Win's first nominee to the House of Representatives is Sam Verzosa, a co-founder of the multi-level marketing firm Frontrow. The organization's campaign was endorsed by gameshow host Willie Revillame. Revillame and Versoza are close friends with the latter's Frontrow also sponsoring the former's Tutok to Win program.

Tutok to Win was an online game show conceptualized and hosted by Revillame in March 2020 amidst the imposition of community quarantines in the Philippines during the early part of the COVID-19 pandemic. The show gave an opportunity to a random viewer to interact and receive prizes from Revillame as well as featured the host's other charity projects. The program would later become a segment of Revillame's television game show Wowowin at GMA Network.  Verzosa was convinced to enter politics by Revillame so that they could serve to a larger population than with the Tutok to Win program. Hence the Tutok To Win Party-List was established and the namesake program was renamed as Tutok Para Manalo. Tutok Para Manalo concluded in February 2022.

Electoral performance

Representatives to Congress

References

External links 

Party-lists represented in the House of Representatives of the Philippines